The 1980 Peter Jackson Classic was contested from August 7–10 at St. George's Golf and Country Club. It was the 8th edition of the Peter Jackson Classic, and the second edition as a major championship on the LPGA Tour.

This event was won by Pat Bradley.

Final leaderboard

External links
 Golf Observer source

Canadian Women's Open
Sports competitions in Toronto
Peter Jackson Classic
Peter Jackson Classic
Peter Jackson Classic